Sosnovka (Narat; , Pünčer) is a rural locality (a village) in Bolshesukhoyazovsky Selsoviet, Mishkinsky District, Bashkortostan, Russia. The population was 615 as of 2010. There are 17 streets.

Geography 
Sosnovka is located 36 km west of Mishkino (the district's administrative centre) by road. Kurmanayevo is the nearest rural locality.

References 

Rural localities in Mishkinsky District